The Tide and Its Takers is the fourth studio album by Alaskan metalcore band 36 Crazyfists. The band filmed a music video for the album's first single, "We Gave It Hell", with director Soren, who has previously worked with the likes of Behemoth and Unearth. The album reached number 155 on the Billboard 200 in its first week as well as number four on the Top Heatseekers, number 23 on the Hard Rock Albums, and number 11 on the Independent Albums chart. The Tide and Its Takers marks the highest first-week sales ever for the band in the US (4,150 copies). The album also peaked at number 83 on the UK Albums Chart. This is the band's last release with longtime bassist Mick Whitney until their 2015 record Time and Trauma.

Track listing

Credits
 Monte Conner – A&R
 Brock Lindow – vocals
 Mick Whitney – bass
 Thomas Noonan – drums
 Steve Holt – guitar, background vocals
 Larry Mazer – management
 Daragh McDonagh – photography
 Andy Sneap – mastering, mixing
 Steve Holt – producer, engineer
 Sons of Nero – artwork

"Only a Year or So..."
 The female spoken word on "Only a Year or So..." is performed by a friend of the band from Portland, Oregon. The spoken word parts are letters sent between a wife and her husband who was fighting in Iraq with the army.

References

36 Crazyfists albums
2008 albums
Roadrunner Records albums
Albums with cover art by Sons of Nero